K.K. Works 1998-2000 is a compilation of tracks by Kahimi Karie recorded in the title years. It was issued in 2001 by the Japanese major label Polydor.

The songs are from the full-length albums K.K.K.K.K. and Tilt and the EPs Journey To The Centre To Me and Once Upon A Time (collaborations with Momus and The Olivia Tremor Control, respectively). The version of Momus' "Pygmalism" found on the K.K. Works album is taken from a remix CD issued with the rare multi-media collector's item K.K. Limited Edition 2000.

Track listing
 "Tilt" (remixed by The Sunshine Fix) – 2:35
 "What Are You Wearing?" (Momus) – 5:35
 "What Are You Wearing?" (remixed by Shinco) – 4:26
 "Sleepwalking" (Arto Lindsay/Gibbs) – 3:08
 "Pygmalism" (Momus; remixed by Optiganally Yours) – 6:46
 "Turtle Song" (Olivia Tremor Control/Thebilldoss) – 3:21
 "Clip-Clap" (Stereo Total) – 2:49
 "Mistaken Memories Of Medieval Manhattan" (Momus) – 4:31
 "Harmony Korine" (Momus) – 4:46
 "Dear Boy" (Arto Lindsay/Cantuaria) – 5:49
 "Do You Know The Time?" (Olivia Tremor Control/Hart) – 3:06
 "Metaphors" (Olivia Tremor Control/Hart) – 2:43
 "The Symphonies Of Beethoven" (Momus) – 4:46
 "Orly-Narita" (Philippe Katerine; remixed by Buffalo Daughter) –5:52
 "I Can't Wait For Summer" (Tomoki Kanda/Kahimi Karie) – 4:14
 "Lost In A Paris Nightclub" (Olivia Tremor Control/Thebilldoss) – 2:39

Kahimi Karie albums
2002 compilation albums